Atwima Nwabiagya Municipal District is one of the forty-three districts in Ashanti Region, Ghana. Originally created as an ordinary district assembly in 1988 when it was known as Atwima District. Later, part of the district was split off by a decree of president John Agyekum Kufuor on 12 November 2003 (effectively 17 February 2004) to create Atwima Mponua District; thus the remaining part was renamed to become Atwima Nwabiagya District. However on 15 March 2018, the northern part of the district was later split off to create Atwima Nwabiagya North District; while the remaining part was elevated to municipal district assembly status on the same year to become Atwima Nwabiagya Municipal District. The municipality is located in the western part of Ashanti Region and has Nkawie as its capital town.

References

Sources
 
 GhanaDistricts.com
 19 New Districts Created, GhanaWeb, November 20, 2003.

Districts of Ashanti Region